Manuel "Manolo" Sanchez (born 1929) was a long-time valet to Richard Nixon, known for his unfailing loyalty and fierce devotion to the former United States president. Sanchez was born in Spain and immigrated to Cuba at a young age. There, he worked as a dishwasher and laborer before moving to the United States. He was employed by Richard Nixon from 1962 to about 1980. The famously reserved Nixon developed a close friendship with Sanchez and once described him as a member of his family.

Early life
Sanchez was born in A Coruña, Spain. In 1946 he immigrated to Cuba where he worked as a dishwasher and laborer. In 1950 he emigrated, again, to Florida in the United States.

Career

Early years with the Nixons
Sanchez began working for Richard and Pat Nixon in 1962 after being referred to the couple by Nixon family friend Bebe Rebozo. Sanchez and his wife Fina moved into the Nixons' 12-room apartment at 810 Fifth Avenue in New York City. Nixon would later describe the Sanchezes as "members of our family in a very special way". Twelve years later, when asked by a reporter if he would continue working for Nixon after he left office, Sanchez responded "the boss will not need to ask me. Wherever he goes in three years from now, he knows I will go with him".

On January 15, 1967, Nixon held a dinner at his home during which he decided to run for president of the United States in 1968. In attendance were Pat Nixon, the Nixon's children, Nixon's longtime secretary Rose Mary Woods, and Manolo and Fina Sanchez. All attendees, except Pat Nixon, encouraged him to seek the Republican nomination.

White House years
Sanchez moved to Washington with the Nixons during the presidency of Richard Nixon, and lived with Fina in a suite on the third floor of the Executive Residence of the White House.

Sanchez, along with the president's physician Major-General Walter Tkach and four United States Secret Service agents, accompanied Nixon during his unannounced 4:40 a.m. visit to the Lincoln Memorial on May 8, 1970, during which he met students protesting the Vietnam War. Nixon reportedly woke Sanchez at 4:22 in the morning and inquired if he'd "ever seen the Lincoln Memorial at night? Get your clothes on, we'll go!" At the memorial, Nixon toured Sanchez inside the sanctum and described the inscriptions; the pair were eventually approached by a group of about 30 protesters and spent the next two hours speaking with them. After White House personnel became aware Nixon had left the building unannounced, Ron Ziegler mounted a mission to retrieve him. After recovering the president, and during the return trip to the White House, Nixon insisted on stopping at the United States Capitol, where he took his former seat in the chamber of the U.S. House of Representatives and instructed Sanchez to make a speech. Sanchez spoke of his pride in being a citizen of the United States and Nixon and some female cleaners who were present applauded. One of the women present, Carrie Moore, asked Nixon to sign her Bible, which he did, and holding her hand told her that his mother "was a saint" and "you be a saint too". White House Chief of Staff H. R. Haldeman would later describe the incident in his diary as "the weirdest day yet".

During his last years in the White House, Nixon became increasingly dependent on Sanchez, and the two developed a constructed language "sometimes using words that only the two of them understood". A jury summons Sanchez received in 1972 prompted a personal letter to the jury commissioner from John Ehrlichman for Sanchez to be excused from service "in order that he can be available to the president". Despite his loyalty to Nixon, Sanchez was known to have disagreed with the president on several occasions. During one incident, in 1973, Nixon expressed frustration to Environmental Protection Agency Administrator Russell E. Train about overly cumbersome environmental regulations, citing the instance of mangrove trees at his property in Key Biscayne, Florida, which he couldn't cut down, before turning to Sanchez and asking "isn't that right"? Sanchez reportedly replied:

Post-presidency
He continued working for Richard and Pat Nixon at their post-presidency home in San Clemente, California. Sanchez was alone with Nixon when the latter suffered a near-fatal relapse after emerging from surgery for phlebitis in 1974. Before slipping into unconsciousness, Nixon told Sanchez "Manolo, I don't think I'm going to get out of here alive". After Nixon received a pardon from Gerald Ford, the Associated Press intercepted Sanchez while he was grocery shopping for Nixon in Palm Springs to get Nixon's reaction. Sanchez replied that,

By 1980, after nearly two decades serving the Nixons, Manolo Sanchez retired with his wife, Fina, and returned to Spain.

Personal life
Sanchez was naturalized a U.S. citizen in 1968; Nixon sponsored his application, attended the ceremony, and took the oath of allegiance with him. Sanchez married his wife, Fina, in Spain.

In popular culture

In the 1995 film Nixon, Sanchez is portrayed by Tony Plana. During one scene in the film, Nixon asks Sanchez what he thinks of John F. Kennedy, to which Sanchez replies "he made me see the stars". In a subsequent interview, Oliver Stone explained that the quote was actually attributed to Robert McNamara and that he assigned it to Sanchez in the film as a joke; Sanchez was known to have intensely disliked Kennedy.

In the 2008 film Frost/Nixon, Sanchez was portrayed by Eloy Casados.

See also
 Colonel Jack Brennan

References

1929 births
American domestic workers
Naturalized citizens of the United States
Nixon administration personnel
People from A Coruña
Possibly living people
Servants
Spanish emigrants to Cuba
Spanish emigrants to the United States